The 2012 Badminton Oceania Championships was the 8th tournament of the Oceania Badminton Championships. It was held in Ballarat, Australia from February 22 to February 25, 2012.

Medalists

Individual Event

Team Event

Medal table

External links
oceaniabadminton.org
Individual events
Men's and Women's Team
Mixed Team

Oceania Badminton Championships
Oceania Badminton Championships
Oceania Badminton Championships
Oceania Badminton Championships
International sports competitions hosted by Australia